Peter Scott Lewis (born August 31, 1953 in San Rafael, California) is an American composer of contemporary classical music.

Career
Lewis's works have been commissioned and/or performed by the Rotterdam Philharmonic; Princeton Symphony Orchestra; Berkeley Symphony Orchestra; Chamber Music Society of Lincoln Center; Alexander String Quartet, Orion String Quartet, and Ciompi Quartet; Dorian Wind Quintet; Conspirare, Intiman Theater; and various conductors and soloists including Kent Nagano, Alan Gilbert, Craig Hella Johnson, David Tanenbaum (guitarist), William Winant, Susan Narucki, Sasha Cooke, Jason Vieaux, and Kees Hülsmann.

His compositions include two violin concertos; Guitar Concerto (Waves of Grain); Cello Concerto; Where the Heart Is Pure, for mezzo-soprano and chamber orchestra; Pacific Triptych (orchestra); An Urban Landscape (orchestra); River Shining Through (string quartet); Night Lights (string quartet); Rhapsodic Images (piano trio); Beaming Contrasts (guitar and string quartet); Through The Mountain (cello and piano); A Whistler's Dream (flute and piano); Three Suites for Guitar; and Sun Music, for piano; among others.

Naxos - American Classics, New Albion, and Lapis Island Records have produced numerous albums devoted to his music. They are Beaming Contrasts (1993), Where The Heart Is Pure (1996), Peter Lewis: Three Suites For Guitar (2003), Atlantic Crossing/Rhapsodic Images (2004), River Shining Through (2007), The Four Cycles (2016), and Home Stretch (2019). Publishers: Theodore Presser Company and Lapis Island Press (SMD).

Lewis graduated from the Yale School of Music (MM) and San Francisco Conservatory of Music (BM). He studied composition with Andrew Imbrie, Jacob Druckman, Nicholas Maw, and Morton Subotnick; studied guitar with Alirio Diaz and Carlos Barbosa-Lima; and conducting with Arthur Weisberg.

Personal life 
Peter Scott Lewis is the son of artist, Clayton Lewis. He attended Garfield High School in Seattle, Washington.

References
Joshua Kosman, San Francisco Chronicle, Sunday: November 21, 2004 "Atlantic Crossing/Rhapsodic Images"
Blair Sanderson, Allmusic: Fall, 2007 "River Shining Through"
Donald Rosenberg, Gramophone Magazine, London, England: December, 2003 "Three Suites for Guitar"

External links
Official Website

Lewis Page at New Albion Records
Lewis Bio at AllMusic

Living people
1953 births
American male classical composers
American classical composers
Yale School of Music alumni
20th-century classical composers
21st-century classical composers
San Francisco Conservatory of Music alumni
Musicians from San Rafael, California
Pupils of Jacob Druckman
21st-century American composers
20th-century American composers
Classical musicians from California
20th-century American male musicians
21st-century American male musicians